Jwira-Pepesa, also known as Gwira and Pepesa-Jwira, is a Niger-Congo language of the Western Region of Ghana, consisting of the mutually intelligible dialects Jwira and Pepesa, with approximately 18,000 speakers total. It is a Kwa language of the Central Tano branch, and shares 60% intelligibility with Nzema and partial intelligibility with Ahanta and Anyin. Jwira is spoken in 18 villages from Bamiankaw to Humjibere along the Ankobra River, while Pepesa is spoken on Wasa land between Agona Junction and Tarkwa. The two dialects are separated by a mountain range.

Orthography 
Jwira-Pepesa has no written form.

References

Central Tano languages
Languages of Ghana